Eugene O'Neill may refer to:

 Eugene O'Neill (1888–1953), American playwright
Eugene O'Neill Theatre, Broadway theater
Eugene O'Neill Theater Center, Connecticut theater 
Eugene O'Neill Award, Swedish acting award
Eugene O'Neill National Historic Site, Danville, California
 Eugene O'Neill Jr. (1910–1950), professor of Greek literature, son of the playwright
 Eugene O'Neill (hurler) (born 1978), Irish hurler
 Eugene M. O'Neill (1850–1926), Irish-born American lawyer and newspaper owner